The 2021 New York City ePrix (formally the 2021 ABB New York City E-Prix) was a pair of Formula E electric car races held at the Brooklyn Street Circuit in the Red Hook neighbourhood of the New York City borough of Brooklyn on 10 and 11 July 2021. It marked the tenth and eleventh rounds of the 2020–21 Formula E season, as well as the fourth running of the event. The first race was won by Maximilian Günther, ahead of Jean-Éric Vergne and Lucas di Grassi. Sam Bird won the second race to claim the championship lead, with Nick Cassidy and António Félix da Costa rounding out the podium.

Classification

Race one

Qualifying

Notes:
  – Joel Eriksson received a 3-place grid penalty due to his power used being over the regulatory limit.

Race

Notes:
  – Pole position.
  – Fastest in group stage.
  – Fastest lap.

Race two

Qualifying

Race
{| class="wikitable sortable" style="font-size: 85%"
! scope="col" | 
! scope="col" | 
! scope="col" | Driver
! scope="col" | Team
! scope="col" | 
! scope="col" class="unsortable" | Time/Retired
! scope="col" | 
! scope="col" | Points
|-
! scope="row" | 1
| align="center" | 10
| data-sort-value="BIR"|  Sam Bird
| Jaguar
| 37
| 46:15.909
| align="center" | 1
| align="center" | 25+3+1
|-
! scope="row" | 2
| align="center" | 37
| data-sort-value="CAS"|  Nick Cassidy
| Virgin-Audi
| 37
| +4.167
| align="center" | 3
| align="center" | 18
|-
! scope="row" | 3
| align="center" | 13
| data-sort-value="DAC"|  António Félix da Costa
| Techeetah-DS
| 37| +4.840| align="center" | 7| align="center" | 15+1|-
! scope="row" | 4
| align="center" | 99| data-sort-value="WEH"|  Pascal Wehrlein| Porsche| 37| +7.154| align="center" | 4| align="center" | 12|-
! scope="row" | 5
| align="center" | 36| data-sort-value="LOT"|  André Lotterer| Porsche| 37| +7.762| align="center" | 6| align="center" | 10|-
! scope="row" | 6
| align="center" | 29| data-sort-value="SIM"|  Alexander Sims| Mahindra| 37| +16.286| align="center" | 9| align="center" | 8|-
! scope="row" | 7
| align="center" | 71| data-sort-value="NAT"|  Norman Nato| Venturi-Mercedes| 37| +24.983| align="center" | 10| align="center" | 6|-
! scope="row" | 8
| align="center" | 4| data-sort-value="FRI"|  Robin Frijns| Virgin-Audi| 37| +25.084| align="center" | 21| align="center" | 4|-
! scope="row" | 9
| align="center" | 94| data-sort-value="LYN"|  Alex Lynn| Mahindra| 37| +25.405| align="center" | 8| align="center" | 2|-
! scope="row" | 10
| align="center" | 28| data-sort-value="GUE"|  Maximilian Günther| Andretti-BMW| 37| +26.009| align="center" | 23| align="center" | 1|-
! scope="row" | 11
| align="center" | 7
| data-sort-value="SET"|  Sérgio Sette Câmara
| Dragon-Penske
| 37
| +26.341
| align="center" | 5
| align="center" | 
|-
! scope="row" | 12
| align="center" | 5
| data-sort-value="VAN"|  Stoffel Vandoorne
| Mercedes
| 37
| +30.781
| align="center" | 20
| align="center" | 
|-
! scope="row" | 13
| align="center" | 20
| data-sort-value="EVA"|  Mitch Evans
| Jaguar
| 37
| +30.957
| align="center" | 2
| align="center" | 
|-
! scope="row" | 14
| align="center" | 11
| data-sort-value="DIG"|  Lucas di Grassi
| Audi
| 37
| +31.970
| align="center" | 12
| align="center" | 
|-
! scope="row" | 15
| align="center" | 23
| data-sort-value="BUE"|  Sébastien Buemi
| e.dams-Nissan
| 37
| +32.985
| align="center" | 13
| align="center" | 
|-
! scope="row" | 16
| align="center" | 27
| data-sort-value="DEN"|  Jake Dennis
| Andretti-BMW
| 37
| +35.692
| align="center" | 19
| align="center" | 
|-
! scope="row" | 17
| align="center" | 48
| data-sort-value="MOR"|  Edoardo Mortara
| Venturi-Mercedes
| 37
| +35.924
| align="center" | 14
| align="center" | 
|-
! scope="row" | 18
| align="center" | 17
| data-sort-value="DEV"|  Nyck de Vries
| Mercedes
| 37
| +36.339
| align="center" | 22
| align="center" | 
|-
! scope="row" | 19
| align="center" | 22
| data-sort-value="ROW"|  Oliver Rowland
| e.dams-Nissan
| 37
| +51.384
| align="center" | 16
| align="center" | 
|-
! scope="row" | 20
| align="center" | 33
| data-sort-value="RAS"|  René Rast
| Audi
| 37
| +59.694
| align="center" | 11
| align="center" | 
|-
! scope="row" | 21
| align="center" | 88
| data-sort-value="BLO"|  Tom Blomqvist
| NIO
| 37
| +1:05.327
| align="center" | 18
| align="center" | 
|-
! scope="row" | 22
| align="center" | 6
| data-sort-value="ERI"|  Joel Eriksson
| Dragon-Penske
| 37
| +1:07.701
| align="center" | 15
| align="center" | 
|-
! scope="row" | Ret
| align="center" | 8
| data-sort-value="TUR"|  Oliver Turvey
| NIO
| 29
| Collision damage
| align="center" | 17
| align="center" | 
|-
! scope="row" | Ret
| align="center" | 25
| data-sort-value="JEV"|  Jean-Éric Vergne
| Techeetah-DS
| 0
| Technical
| align="center" | 24
| align="center" | 
|-
! colspan="8" |Source:
|}Notes:  – Pole position; fastest in group stage.
  – Fastest lap.
  – Lucas di Grassi received a 10-second time penalty for causing a collision.
  – Oliver Rowland received a 5-second time penalty for causing a collision.

Notes

References

|- style="text-align:center"
|width="35%"|Previous race:2021 Puebla ePrix|width="30%"|FIA Formula E World Championship2020–21 season|width="35%"|Next race:2021 London ePrix|- style="text-align:center"
|width="35%"|Previous race:2019 New York City ePrix|width="30%"|New York City ePrix|width="35%"|Next race:2022 New York City ePrix'''
|- style="text-align:center"

2021
2020–21 Formula E season
2021 in American motorsport
July 2021 sports events in the United States
2021 in sports in New York City